John O. Bellis (1872-1943) was an American silversmith and jeweler based in San Francisco, California. He was trained as a silversmith at Shreve & Co., and he designed silver plates, bowls, trays, mirrors, and brushes. He began designing jewelry in 1894. He opened a new store at 55 Geary Street in 1914.

His silverware can be seen at the Fine Arts Museums of San Francisco and the Los Angeles County Museum of Art (LACMA).

References

1872 births
1943 deaths
People from San Francisco
American silversmiths
20th-century American jewellers